Black Wooden is a compilation EP by Mount Eerie, the musical project of musician Phil Elverum. It was released on December 14, 2009. It is the first and only record by Elverum to be released under the Latitudes Series by Southern Records.

Recording
The EP was recorded at Southern Studios in London, England while Elverum was touring the UK in the summer of 2007, using a borrowed guitar alongside Southern Records engineer Harvey Birrell.

Reception

Upon release, the EP received a generally positive reception. Matthew Solarski of Pitchfork wrote that "if you're but an aspiring convert who's reluctant to make a huge commitment, as a welcome mat to the realm of Mount Eerie, you could do much worse".

Luke Winkle of Spectrum Culture while enjoying the EP found it at times frustrating or "astoundingly boring" but ultimately said that "He’s at his best when keeping it simple, and when the songs do drift into hollow wankery ("Marriage"), he’s quick to refocus on the coniferous textures that make the music worth listening to in the first place".

Chase McMullen of Beats Per Minute said that the EP was a "pretty simplistic listen. While strong, the EP doesn't really boast one of those epiphanous Elverum moments. It's fine, but easily lost amongst the vast catalog the man already offers".

Track listing

References

Mount Eerie albums
2009 EPs